The 1943 Fort Riley Centaurs football team represented the Cavalry Replacement Training Center at Fort Riley, a United States Army installation located in North Central Kansas, as an independent during the 1943 college football season. The team compiled a 6–2–1 record and outscored opponents by a total of 226 to 92.

Fran Welch was the team's head coach. Players included Reino Nori (quarterback, Chicago Bears), Bernie Ruman (halfback, Arizona), Bob Ruman (quarterback/halfback), Keith Caywood, Bennie Sheridan, Corwin Clatt (fullback), Leonard Klusman, Daniel Carmichael, Bobby Ford (halfback, Mississippi State), Paul Duhart, Clifton Patton (guard), Sam Goldman, Bob Balaban (end), and George Wendall.

Schedule

References

Fort Riley
Fort Riley Centaurs football
Fort Riley Centaurs football